Oscar Andriani (28 December 1905 – 17 July 1987) was an Italian actor and playwright. He appeared in more than fifty films from 1937 to 1969.

Life and career
He had a prolific career as a character film actor, often appearing alongside his real life friend Amedeo Nazzari. He also was a playwright, whose works (often published under pseudonyms) were staged by prominent companies, such as the Giovanni Grasso's, Carlo Veneziani's and Tino Scotti's ones. He wrote the script of the partially autobiographical film World of Miracles, directed in 1959 by Luigi Capuano.

Filmography

References

External links 

1905 births
1987 deaths
Italian male film actors
Actors from Brescia